Argemiro Pinheiro da Silva known as Argemiro (3 June 1915 – 4 July 1975) was a Brazilian football player. He played for the Brazil national team at the 1938 FIFA World Cup finals.

References

External links
Profile at Globo Esporte's Futpedia

1915 births
1975 deaths
Brazilian footballers
Brazil international footballers
1938 FIFA World Cup players
CR Vasco da Gama players
Association football midfielders
People from Ribeirão Preto
Footballers from São Paulo (state)